Charenton is the name or part of the name of several places:

France
 Charenton-le-Pont, in the Val-de-Marne département, a commune which has a common border with Paris
 Saint-Maurice, Val-de-Marne, a neighboring commune that was called Charenton-Saint-Maurice until 1842
 Charenton (asylum)
 Charenton-du-Cher, in the Cher département
Rue de Charenton, a street in Paris

United States

 Charenton, Louisiana